Albert James Freeman (19 July 1887 – 7 January 1945) was an English cricketer. He played one first-class match for Surrey in 1919. He was killed by enemy action, dying at Miller Hospital, Greenwich, during World War II.

See also
 List of Surrey County Cricket Club players

References

External links
 

1887 births
1945 deaths
English cricketers
Surrey cricketers
People from Kennington
Cricketers from Greater London
British civilians killed in World War II